The Mifos Initiative is a U.S.-based non-profit that exists to support and collectively lead the open source Mifos X project. Founded in October 2011, the organization encompasses a community of financial service providers, technology specialists, financial services experts and open source developers working together to grow the Mifos X open source platform for financial services. Its goal is to speed the elimination of poverty by enabling financial service providers to more effectively and efficiently deliver responsible financial services to the world's 2.5 billion poor and unbanked.

History 

Development of the software began as an initiative of the Grameen Foundation in 2004. It was initiated by James Dailey and Tapan Parikh, and launched as open-source software Mifos in 2006. The name "Mifos" originally came from an acronym "Micro Finance Open Source", but is now used as the brand, rather than an acronym. Mifos existed within Grameen Foundation until 2011, when it was decided that Mifos would split off to be an independent, open-source entity.

On June 1, 2011, Grameen Foundation announced that it would be  ending its direct involvement with the Mifos Initiative and transitioning the project to its own organization, the Mifos Initiative, which now controls the Mifos and MIfos X projects.

Community 

The MifosX community includes developers, implementers, and users from various countries who collaborate through mailing lists, IRC, and annual conferences.

MifosX organizes an annual summit for developers and users with conferences, exhibitions and other audience-oriented events. The 2012 summit was held in Bangalore, and in 2013, it was held at Jaipur in the month of October. Held in Kuampala, Uganda, the 2014 Summit was a four-day event with a large focus on hands-on training for partners and users, collaborative tech sessions for contributors, and educational sessions focussing on fin-tech and the financial inclusion sector.

MifosX has also participated in several other independent events. In 2013, Mifos has participated in Google Summer of Code as well as Random Hacks of Kindness during RHoK Global December 2012. Moreover, Mifos has been part of the FinDEVr San Francisco 2014 event, acting as a sponsor. One of Mifos' members, James Dailey (board member and Chief Innovation Officer), took the stage to discuss the reinvention of banking. On the first of November, Mifos Initiative also took part in the Global Islamic Microfinance Forum, held in Dubai, UAE.

Management 

CEO of Mifos Initiative is Edward Cable, its Execute Director is Craig Chelius.

Board of Directors 

 Paul Maritz (Chairman of the Board and CEO of Pivotal)
 Zaheda Bhorat
 James Dailey
 Suresh Krishna (managing director of Grameen Financial Services Private Ltd)
 Dave Neary
 Craig Chelius
 Edward Cable

Qualifications and prizes 
 Mifos earns high ratings on CGAP Software Listings 
 Mifos won a Duke's Choice Award in 2009 for "Java Technology for the Open Source Community" 
 Mifos participated in the Google Summer Of Code 2009, 2010, 2013, 2014, 2016, 2017, 2018 and 2019.
 Mifos also came as a runner up to the 'Fintech for Good' award, coming second after Deutsche Bank – Community Hackathons.

References

External links

Financial software
Free software programmed in Java (programming language)
Microfinance